Coolboy is a village in County Wicklow, Ireland.

Coolboy may also refer to:
 Coolboy Ngamole, South African marathon runner
 Coolboy, a townland in County Tipperary, Ireland – see List of townlands of County Tipperary
 Coolboys and the Frontman, Australian rock band